Operation Polka Dot was a U.S. Army test of a biological cluster bomb during the early 1950s.

Operation
Operation Polka Dot was a field test of the E133 cluster bomb undertaken at Dugway Proving Ground in Utah during the early 1950s. The operation was detailed in a July 18, 1955 U.S. Army report that also detailed Operation Trouble Maker. The operation was classified "secret" and involved filling the munitions with the biological agent simulant, Bacillus globigii.

See also
Operation Dew
Operation LAC

References

Polka Dot
Polka Dot
Polka Dot